The following is a list of international presidential trips made by Emmerson Mnangagwa became the 3rd President of Zimbabwe on 24 November 2017 following the removal of predecessor Robert Mugabe that year.

2017

2018

2019

2020

References 

Emmerson Mnangagwa
2019 in international relations
2018 in international relations
2017 in international relations
Mnangagwa, Emmerson
Mnangagwa
Foreign relations of Zimbabwe
Mnangagwa
Mnangagwa